The women's BMX race competition at the 2014 Asian Games in Incheon was held on 1 October 2014 at the Ganghwa Asiad BMX Track.

Schedule
All times are Korea Standard Time (UTC+09:00)

Results

Seeding run

Motos

References 
Cycling BMX – Women's Seeding Run
Cycling BMX – Women's Final

External links
Official website

BMX Women